Smoky Mountain Cup is a professional wrestling event held by Innovate Wrestling as a one-night tournament.  It was first held on April 1, 2011.

List of winners

Results

Smoky Mountain Cup (2011)
The first Smoky Mountain Cup took place on April 1, 2011, in Kingsport, Tennessee.

Smoky Mountain Cup (2012)
The second Smoky Mountain Cup took place on March 30, 2012, in Kingsport, Tennessee.

Smoky Mountain Cup (2013)
The third Smoky Mountain Cup took place on April 26, 2013, in Kingsport, Tennessee.

Smoky Mountain Cup (2014)
The fourth Smoky Mountain Cup took place on April 19, 2014, in Kingsport, Tennessee.

Smoky Mountain Cup (2015)
The fifth Smoky Mountain Cup took place on April 17, 2015, in Kingsport, Tennessee.

References

External links

Recurring sporting events established in 2011
Smoky Mountain Wrestling
Professional wrestling tournaments